This is a list of the highest-ranked rulers based on the island of Taiwan.

Dutch and Spanish Formosa (1624–1662)

Dutch Formosa (1624–1662) 

The Dutch Empire, during the period of the Dutch United Provinces and under the auspices of the Dutch East India Company (VOC), attempted to conquer Macau in 1622. Later they colonized the Pescadores Islands, where they built a fort in Makung. In 1624, the Chinese attacked, and the Dutch were driven to Taiwan (then called Formosa, meaning "beautiful island"). That year they established Fort Zeelandia on Taiwan's southwest coast. In 1637, the Dutch conquered Favorolang (also Favorlang; present day Huwei, Yunlin). The names listed here are the Dutch governors:

Spanish Formosa (1626–1642) 

In response to the Dutch settlements, the Spanish settled at Keelung on the northeast coast of the island in 1626 and built Fort San Salvador. Later they built another outpost, Fort San Domingo, at Tamsui in the northwest. In 1629 these forts had a combined total of about 200 Spaniards and 400 Filipinos. By 1635, the Tamsui settlement was abandoned; however, the Keelung settlement remained in Spanish hands until 1642, when a Dutch force of 11 ships and 1,000 men attacked the fort of 446 people. The Spanish surrendered.

Kingdom of Tungning (1662–1683) 

The Southern Ming (Ming dynasty loyalists) came to Taiwan under Koxinga, expelling the Dutch and capturing Fort Zeelandia. They established the Kingdom of Tungning.

* Regency of Feng Xifan from 1682 to 1683.

Taiwan Under the Rule of the Qing Dynasty (1683–1895)

Taiwan-Amoy Circuit (1683–1721) 
The Qing dynasty invaded Taiwan; the Ming rulers surrendered and were expelled.

Taiwan-Xiamen Circuit Commissioner (福建分巡台灣廈門道, 1687—1727)

Taiwan Circuit (1721–1885) 
Qing rule was reestablished after a month-long revolt. The Taiwan Circuit was established in 1727 with its seat in Taiwan-fu, unlike its predecessor, the Taiwan-Amoy Circuit, which was based in Xiamen. The Taiwan Circuit Commissioner had its powers checked by the Taiwan Circuit Investigating censors.

Taiwan Circuit Commissioner (福建分巡台灣道)

Taiwan Circuit Investigating Censor (巡視台灣監察御史)

Taiwan Military Circuit Commissioner (福建分巡臺灣兵備道, 1767-1791)

Provincial Censor-ranked Taiwan Military Circuit Commissioner (按察使銜分巡台灣兵備道, 1791-1895)

Governor of Fukien-Taiwan Province (1885–1895)

Republic of Formosa (1895) 

The Republic of Formosa was a short-lived republic that existed on the island of Taiwan in 1895 between the formal cession of Taiwan by the Qing dynasty of China to the Empire of Japan by the Treaty of Shimonoseki and its being taken over by Japanese troops. The Republic was proclaimed on 23 May 1895 and extinguished on 21 October, when the Republican capital Tainan was taken over by the Japanese.

Taiwan under Japanese rule (1895–1945) 

After establishing control over the island, the Japanese used the French Empire model of an occupying force and were instrumental in the industrialization of the island; they built railroads, a sanitation system and a public school system, among other things. Around 1935, the Japanese began an island-wide assimilation project to bind the island more firmly to the empire.

In 1941, war broke out when the Japanese attacked the U.S. naval port of Pearl Harbor in Hawaii. By 1945, desperate plans were in place to incorporate popular representation of Taiwan into the Imperial Diet to end colonial rule of the island and transfer occupying troops to the front lines to fight the Allies. The names listed here are the Japanese governor-generals:

Taiwan under the rule of the Republic of China (from 1945)

Following the end of World War II in 1945, under the terms of the Instrument of Surrender of Japan, the control of Taiwan was to be transferred to the Republic of China (ROC). ROC troops were authorized to come to Taiwan to accept the surrender of Japanese military forces and occupy Taiwan on behalf of the Allied Powers in General Order No. 1, issued by Douglas MacArthur, the Supreme Commander of the Allied Powers, on 2 September 1945. ROC troops were later transported to Keelung by the U.S. Navy, and Japanese handed the control of Taiwan to the ROC on 25 October 1945, which began a period of military occupation.

Following its defeat in the Chinese Civil War in 1949, Premier Yan Xishan proclaimed the ROC Government's relocation to Taiwan (where it exists until today), thus replacing the Provincial Chairperson as the highest-ranked executive official on Taiwan. This lasted until March 1950, when Chiang Kai-shek resumed his duties as President in Taipei. However, Japan relinquished sovereignty of Taiwan and Penghu in the Treaty of San Francisco on 28 April 1952, without specifying whom the sovereignty was ceded to. Because the ROC only held Taiwan, Penghu and other nearby islands, the regime remained the internationally recognized government of China with sovereignty throughout mainland China, Tibet Area, Sinkiang and Outer Mongolia until recognition shifted to the People's Republic of China by the United Nations in 1971 and the United States in 1979. After the constitutional amendments in 1991, the president is elected by popular vote among citizens of the Republic of China in the "Free Area of the Republic of China" (area under de facto Republic of China administration), instead of by the National Assembly.

Governor of Taiwan Province (1945–1949)

Presidents of the Executive Yuan of the Republic of China (1949–1950)

Presidents of the Republic of China (from 1 March 1950)

See also
 History of the Republic of China
 History of Taiwan
 Taiwan

References

History of Taiwan
Taiwan
Lists of Taiwanese politicians